Chopped Junior is an American reality-based cooking television game show series hosted by Ted Allen that pits four adolescent chefs against each other, competing for a chance to win $10,000 and a Chopped Junior chef's coat. The show is a spin-off of Chopped. It aired on Food Network and reran on Discovery Family.

Episodes

References

2015 American television series debuts
2019 American television series endings
2010s American children's game shows
2010s American cooking television series
American children's reality television series
American television spin-offs
English-language television shows
Food Network original programming
Food reality television series
Reality television spin-offs 
Cooking competitions in the United States
Television series about children
Television series about teenagers